TIRAP is an adapter molecule associated with toll-like receptors.
The innate immune system recognizes microbial pathogens through Toll-like receptors (TLRs), which identify pathogen-associated molecular patterns. Different TLRs recognize different pathogen-associated molecular patterns and all TLRs have a Toll-interleukin 1 receptor (TIR) domain, which is responsible for signal transduction. The protein encoded by this gene is a TIR adaptor protein involved in the TLR4 signaling pathway of the immune system. It activates NF-kappa-B, MAPK1, MAPK3 and JNK, which then results in cytokine secretion and the inflammatory response. Alternative splicing of this gene results in several transcript variants; however, not all variants have been fully described.

See also
 Myd88

External links